The NA numbers as assigned by the United States Department of Transportation.

See also
 List of UN numbers

References 
 
 

NA numbers